Frederick Charles "Fuzzy" Thurston (December 29, 1933 – December 14, 2014) was an American football player who played offensive guard for the Baltimore Colts and the Green Bay Packers.

Early years
Born and raised in the small western Wisconsin town of Altoona, Thurston accepted a basketball scholarship to Valparaiso University in northwest Indiana, and didn't play collegiate football for the Crusaders until his junior season (1954).  He played basketball because his high school didn't have a football team.  Thurston played junior varsity basketball as a 190-pound freshman at Valparaiso before gaining 40 pounds and joining the football team his sophomore year.  He led Valparaiso to an Indiana Collegiate Conference title and was twice selected All-American. Thurston was also named All-Conference for the 1954 and 1955 seasons, while being named the conference's top lineman in 1955. He was selected by the Philadelphia Eagles in the fifth round of the 1956 NFL Draft.

Pro football
As the left guard, Thurston was a key member of the Packers' offensive line during the team's glory years under head coach Vince Lombardi, when they won five NFL championships and the first two Super Bowls. Paired with hall of famer Jerry Kramer at right guard, they led the vaunted Packers sweep running attack.

Prior to joining the Packers, Thurston played the 1958 season with the NFL champion Baltimore Colts. 
Thus, Thurston is one of only four players in pro football history to play on six NFL championship teams. He was inducted into the Green Bay Packers Hall of Fame in 

He remained popular in Wisconsin after his playing days and could often be found at Fuzzy's, a bar he owned not far from 

Thurston was elected to the Indiana Football Hall of Fame in 1982, and the Wisconsin Athletic Hall of Fame in 2003. He was the first athlete ever to be voted in by the people of Wisconsin, even though the Hall had been founded in 1951. The Professional Football Researchers Association named Thurston to the PRFA Hall of Very Good Class

Death
After several years of declining health, Thurston died at age 80 in Green Bay, battling Alzheimer's disease

References

External links
 
 Green Bay Packers Hall of Fame - (inducted 1975)
 Valparaiso University Athletics Hall of Fame
 
 

1933 births
2014 deaths
People from Eau Claire County, Wisconsin
Players of American football from Wisconsin
American football offensive guards
Valparaiso Beacons football players
Baltimore Colts players
Green Bay Packers players
Valparaiso Beacons men's basketball players